Mark Symonds Teversham (5 April 1895 – 15 November 1973) was a soldier and cricketer. He captained Mysore in the first ever Ranji Trophy match in 1934–35.

In his professional career, he served in the British Indian Army from 1915 to 1947 and retired as a Brigadier.

References

1895 births
1973 deaths
Indian cricketers
Karnataka cricketers